The 1968–69 Rugby League Lancashire Cup competition was the fifty-sixth occasion on which the Lancashire Cup completion had been held. St. Helens won the trophy  by beating Oldham by the score of 30-2. The match was played at Central Park, Wigan, (historically in the county of Lancashire). The attendance was 17,008 and receipts were £4644. This was the second of two consecutive Lancashire Cup final wins for St. Helens, and what is more, the seventh of the seven occasions on which the club will win the trophy in nine successive seasons.

Background 

The total number of teams entering the competition remained the same at 14.
The same fixture format was retained, and due to the number of clubs this resulted in no bye but one “blank” or “dummy” fixture in the first round, and one bye in the second round.

Competition and results

Round 1 
Involved  7 matches (with no bye but one “blank” fixture) and 14 clubs

Round 1 - Replay 
Involved  1 match

Round 2 - Quarter-finals 
Involved 3 matches (with one bye) and 7 clubs

Round 3 – Semi-finals  
Involved 2 matches and 4 clubs

Final

Teams and scorers 

Scoring - Try = three (3) points - Goal = two (2) points - Drop goal = two (2) points

The road to success

Notes and comments 
1 * This was the first Lancashire Cup match played by new/newly renamed club Huyton (who were "homeless" for this their first season)
2 * Central Park was the home ground of Wigan with a final capacity of 18,000, although the record attendance was  47,747 for Wigan v St Helens 27 March 1959

See also 
1968–69 Northern Rugby Football League season
Rugby league county cups

References

External links
Saints Heritage Society
1896–97 Northern Rugby Football Union season at wigan.rlfans.com
Hull&Proud Fixtures & Results 1896/1897
Widnes Vikings - One team, one passion Season In Review - 1896-97
The Northern Union at warringtonwolves.org

1968 in English rugby league
RFL Lancashire Cup